Propebela popovia is a species of sea snail, a marine gastropod mollusk in the family Mangeliidae.

Description
The length of the shell attains 13 mm, its diameter 5.5 mm.

(Original description) The white shell shows a straw-colored periostracum. It consists of  six shouldered whorls, a subglobular small protoconch, and a distinct suture. The spiral sculpture consists of (on the upper whorl four or five) rounded threads, between the shoulder and the succeeding suture. The threading is obsolete on the body whorl or reduced to fine striation on the base and on the siphonal canal. The axial sculpture on the spire  consists of about 16 short rounded ribs swollen at the shoulder and reaching the succeeding suture, but fainter on the body whorl and absent from the base. The aperture is simple. The columella is white and erased. The siphonal canal is short and straight.

Distribution
This marine species was found from Bristol Bay, Bering Sea, to Monterey Bay, California, USA.

References

External links
 
 

popovia
Gastropods described in 1919